Peter Mumford (14 October 1922 – 1992) was a bishop of the Church of England.  He was the Bishop of Hertford from 1974 to 1981 and the Bishop of Truro from 1981 to 1989.

Mumford was educated at Sherborne School and University College, Oxford. After Second World War service with the Royal Artillery he began his ordained ministry as a  curate at St Mark's Salisbury. He was then the  vicar of St Andrew's Bedford, the rector of Crawley and finally, from 1973 until his ordination to the episcopate, the Archdeacon of St Albans. He married Jane and they had two sons and a daughter: his wife survived him.

Mumford wrote an autobiography, including "reflections", called Quick-eyed Love Observing (the title alludes to a poem by George Herbert), which was published after his death.

Mumford failed to take action or to launch an investigation into Jeremy Dowlingm (later Dowling was convicted of sex offenses against boys). A review found, that "There is no doubt that there were a number of missed opportunities for the diocese of Truro to undertake its own investigations into the allegations made in 1972 against Jeremy Dowling."

References

1922 births
People educated at Sherborne School
Alumni of University College, Oxford
British Army personnel of World War II
Royal Artillery officers
Archdeacons of St Albans
Bishops of Hertford
Bishops of Truro
20th-century Church of England bishops
1992 deaths